Alexei Vladimirovich Tereshchenko (born 16 December 1980) is a Russian professional ice hockey forward, who is currently an unrestricted free agent, he most recently played for Avangard Omsk of the Kontinental Hockey League (KHL).

Playing career
From 1998 till 2004 Tereshchenko played for the Russian Super League club Dynamo Moscow. Then for the Ak Bars Kazan. Since 2007 played for the Salavat Yulaev Ufa. Became champion of Russia with this club in 2008 and World champion the same year.

On 15 July 2014, Tereshchenko returned to Dynamo Moscow on a one-year contract for the 2014–15 season.

International play
Tereshchenko was also selected as a reserve by Team Russia for the 2010 Winter Olympics should an injury occur during the tournament.

Honours
Russian championship:  2000, 2005, 2006, 2008
European Champions cup:  2006, 2007

Career statistics

Regular season and playoffs

International

References

External links

1980 births
Living people
Ak Bars Kazan players
Avangard Omsk players
Dallas Stars draft picks
HC Dinamo Minsk players
HC Dynamo Moscow players
Ice hockey players at the 2014 Winter Olympics
Olympic ice hockey players of Russia
People from Mozhaysk
Russian ice hockey centres
Salavat Yulaev Ufa players
Sportspeople from Moscow Oblast